The Bangladesh Rowing Federation is the national federation for rowing and is responsible for governing the sport in Bangladesh. Mollah M Abu Kaiser is the president and Hazi M Khorshed Alam is the general secretary of the federation.

History
The Bangladesh Rowing Federation was established in 1974. It created a bridge between traditional boating in Bangladesh and more modern boating competition. The Bangladesh Rowing Federation organizes Nouka Baich events in Bangladesh. It is a national member of the International Rowing Federation.

References

Rowing in Bangladesh
National members of the World Rowing Federation
1976 establishments in Bangladesh
Sports organizations established in 1976
Rowing
Organisations based in Dhaka